The News Parade of the Year 1942 is a 1942 9-minute documentary film made in the United States and directed by Eugene W. Castle for his Castle Films home movie reel company. It is composed of newsreel footage of wartime activity and includes footage of Joseph Stalin, Winston Churchill and others. The Detroit Institute of Arts has it in its catalog. Ball State University also has a copy.

References

External links
 
 

1942 films
American black-and-white films
American World War II propaganda shorts
American short documentary films
1942 documentary films
1940s short documentary films
1940s English-language films
1940s American films